Sean Marsden (born 17 January 1980 in Stirling) is a rugby union player who was born in Scotland but has spent most of his life in England, being capped by England at U16 Level, even scoring a hat-trick of tries against the land of his birth.

He was then capped as part of the England under-18's team and played in the U18 Five Nations as it was then, now the U18 Six Nations. At the same time Sean played for Gloucester Rugby's Academy.

A wing or fullback, he was part of the highly successful Bristol U21 team coached by Paul Hull that won the English U21 title 3 times in a row. At the start of the 2007 season he went on trial with the Exeter Chiefs to prove his fitness after an injury hit season with the Scottish regional team, the Glasgow Warriors. He formerly played for Bristol in two spells as well as spells at Exeter and Neath. He attended Bristol Grammar School.

In July 2010, he re-signed for Bristol, before leaving at the end of the 2011–12 season to join the U18 coaching staff at Hartpury College in Gloucester as Academy Head Coach. He stopped playing for Hartpury College R.F.C. in 2015. 

Sean guided his team to the prestigious AASE title for several successive years. 

In 2019, Marsden coached England U18s.

In June 2016 Sean rejoined Bristol Rugby as part of the coaching team. He is currently the Skills Coach for Bristol Bears.

References

External links
Glasgow profile
Exeter profile

Bristol Bears profile
Hartpury

1980 births
Living people
People educated at Bristol Grammar School
Scottish rugby union players
Bristol Bears players
Rugby union players from Stirling
Glasgow Warriors players
Scotland international rugby sevens players
Male rugby sevens players